Law clerks have assisted the justices of the United States Supreme Court in various capacities since the first one was hired by Justice Horace Gray in 1882. Each justice is permitted to have between three and four law clerks per Court term. Most persons serving in this capacity are recent law school graduates (and typically graduated at the top of their class). Among their many functions, clerks do legal research that assists justices in deciding what cases to accept and what questions to ask during oral arguments, prepare memoranda, and draft orders and opinions. After retiring from the Court, a justice may continue to employ a law clerk, who may be assigned to provide additional assistance to an active justice or may assist the retired justice when sitting by designation with a lower court.

Table of law clerks 
The following is a table of law clerks serving the associate justice holding Supreme Court seat 3 (the Court's third associate justice seat by the order of precedence of the inaugural associate justices) which was established on September 24, 1789 by the 1st Congress through the Judiciary Act of 1789.  This seat is currently occupied by Justice Sonia Sotomayor.

|}

|}

|}

|}

|}

|}

|}

|}

|}

|}

|}
|}

Notes

References

Additional sources
 Baier, Paul R. (1973). "The Law Clerks: Profile of an Institution," Vanderbilt L. Rev. 26: 1125–77.
 Brudney, Victor and Richard F. Wolfson, "Mr. Justice Rutledge—Law Clerks' Reflections," 35 Iowa L. Rev. (1950).
 "Finding Aid to the William Brennan Papers," Library of Congress (2001, rev'd April 2010), list of clerks.
 "Georgia Law Alumni Who Have Clerked for a U.S. Supreme Court Justice," Advocate, Spring/Summer 2004 (listing 6 names).
 Judicial Clerkship Handbook, USC Gould Law School, 2013-2014, p. 33, Appendix B.
 Newland, Charles A. (June 1961). "Personal Assistants to the Supreme Court Justices: The Law Clerks," Oregon L. Rev. 40: 306–07.
 News of Supreme Court clerks. University of Virginia Law School, list of clerks, 2004-2018.
 University of Michigan clerks to the Supreme Court, 1991-2017, University of Michigan Law School Web site (2016). Retrieved September 20, 2016.
 Ward, Artemus and David L. Weiden (2006). Sorcerers' Apprentices: 100 Years of Law Clerks at the United States Supreme Court. New York, NY: New York University Press. , .

External links
 Supreme Court of the United States official website
 SCOTUS Justices: How Do Their Clerks Help Them?, Marcia Coyle of the National Law Journal,  by PBS NewsHour, via youtube

Seat 03
Supreme Court of the United States people